Vernon Harrison Courtenay (1932 – 15 August 2009) was a Belizean politician who served as Minister of Foreign Affairs from 1983 to 1984.

Family 
His son Eamon Courtenay also served as Minister of Foreign Affairs.

References 

1932 births
2009 deaths
20th-century Belizean politicians
Foreign ministers of Belize
Members of the Senate (Belize)
Members of the House of Representatives (Belize)
People's United Party politicians